Leopold Dukes (17 January 1810, Pozsony – 3 August 1891, Vienna) was a Hungarian critic of Jewish literature.

Biography
Dukes spent about 20 years in England, and from his researches in the Bodleian Library and the British Museum (which contain two of the most valuable Hebrew libraries in the world) Dukes was able to complete the work of Leopold Zunz. The most popular work of Dukes was his Rabbinische Blumenlese (1844), in which he collected the rabbinic proverbs and illustrated them from the gnomic literatures of other peoples.

Dukes made many contributions to philology, but his best work was connected with the medieval Hebrew poetry, especially Ibn Gabirol.

See also 
 Adolf Dux

References 

Attribution

External links 
 
 Jewish Encyclopedia entry written by Isidore Singer & Isaac Broydé
 Digitized works by Leopold Dukes at the Leo Baeck Institute, New York

Hungarian literary critics
Jewish Hungarian writers
Hungarian expatriates in the United Kingdom
Hungarian expatriates in Germany
Writers from Bratislava
1810 births
1891 deaths